Rustaveli Avenue (Rust'avelis Gamziri), formerly known as Golovin Street, is the central avenue in  Tbilisi named after the medieval Georgian poet, Shota Rustaveli.

The avenue starts at Freedom Square and extends for about 1.5 km in length, before it turns into an extension of Kostava Street. Rustaveli is often considered the main thoroughfare of Tbilisi due to the numerous governmental, public, cultural, and business buildings that are located along or near the avenue. The Parliament of Georgia building, the Georgian National Opera Theater, the Rustaveli State Academic Theater, the Georgian Academy of Sciences, Kashveti Church, the Georgian Museum of Fine Arts, Simon Janashia Museum of Georgia (part of the Georgian National Museum), and Biltmore Hotel Tbilisi among others, are all located on Rustaveli.

In 1989, tens of thousands of Georgians gathered before the House of Government on Rustaveli Avenue. An attack by the Soviet Spetsnaz forces killed many protesters in the April 9 tragedy.

Accessibility
The thoroughfare is served by the Tbilisi Metro and buses. It is one metro stop away from another historical artery of Tbilisi, Agmashenebeli Avenue

Life on Rustaveli Avenue
Rustaveli Avenue starts at Freedom Square. The first building on Rustaveli Avenue is Rustaveli Cinema, the biggest cinema in Georgia. Opposite the cinema are the Youth Palace and former Parliament Building of Georgia. Kashveti Church is located between the Art House of Tbilisi and the Art Museum. There are many beautiful buildings on Rustaveli Avenue; among them are the Tbilisi Opera House and the Rustaveli Theatre. The avenue is full of various cafes, shops, restaurants and other entertainment places. Rustaveli Avenue is a mix of modern and 20th-century architecture. Rustaveli Avenue is a place of many public protests, but it's also the place of many outdoor exhibitions, performances, etc. The avenue is one of the best architectural and tourist centers of Tbilisi.

Gallery

See also
David Agmashenebeli Avenue

References

 
Streets in Tbilisi
Tourist attractions in Tbilisi